Kim Myung-ja (born 10 March 1955) is a North Korean speed skater. She competed in the women's 1500 metres at the 1972 Winter Olympics.

References

External links
 

1955 births
Living people
North Korean female speed skaters
Olympic speed skaters of North Korea
Speed skaters at the 1972 Winter Olympics
Place of birth missing (living people)